Steven George Lawson (born December 28, 1950) is a former Major League Baseball pitcher who appeared in 13 for the Texas Rangers during the 1972 Texas Rangers season. After spending the 1973 and 1974 seasons with the Spokane Indians of the Pacific Coast League, he retired from baseball. 

A single in his only at-bat left Lawson with a rare MLB career batting average of 1.000.

References

External links

1950 births
Living people
Texas Rangers players
Major League Baseball pitchers
Baseball players from California
Coos Bay-North Bend A's players
Burlington Bees players
Iowa Oaks players
Spokane Indians players
Tri-City A's players